The Flag Officer, West Africa (FOWA) was a military command of the British Royal Navy during the Second World War. It existed from 1942 to 1945.

The Royal Navy's prior history in West Africa 
During the 19th century, the West Africa Squadron was created, primarily as an anti-slavery effort. Later the Cape of Good Hope Station, homeported at Simonstown, South Africa, merged with the West Coast of Africa Station to create the Cape of Good Hope and West Africa Station for the periods 1857-1865 and 1867-1920.

 1807: British slave trade illegal
 1808: First RN anti-slavery patrol, West Africa Squadron, ships on "particular service"
 1819: West African Station an independent command under a Commodore
 1840: West African Station still independent, but not under a Commodore
 1842: West African Station once more commanded by a Commodore
 1857-1865: West African Station again combined with Cape of Good Hope Station
 1866: West African Station an independent command again
 1867 West Africa/Preventative Squadron is disbanded
 1867-1920 Ships in West Africa under control of Commander-in-Chief, Cape of Good Hope Station and West Africa Station
 1942-1945 Flag Officer, West Africa operated from Freetown, Sierra Leone

The Second World War 
In 1941, escort forces began to be built up at Freetown. The post of Flag Officer, West Africa was established in August 1942 as part of the Admiralty re-organisation of commands. He initially controlled two corvettes and a few Free French ships. This was due to the growing importance of Freetown as a major base for convoy escorts. It existed until 1945.

Flag Officers, West Africa
Post holders included:

Components
Distribution of units attached to station included:

References

External links
 Mackie, Colin. (2018) "Royal Navy Senior Appointments from 1865" (PDF). gulabin.com. Colin Mackie. Scotland, UK.
 Watson, Dr Graham. "Royal Navy Organisation in World War 2, 1939-1945:West Africa Command". www.naval-history.net. Gordon Smith, 19 September 2015.

 

Flag officers of the Royal Navy
Military units and formations established in 1942
Military units and formations disestablished in 1945